Sinner is the debut studio album by the American rock band Drowning Pool, released on June 5, 2001, by Wind-up Records. It is considered to be the band's most popular album, being certified platinum in the same year that it was released. This was due at least in part to "Bodies" which remains the band's most well-known song. This is the only studio album by the band to feature original lead singer Dave Williams. While touring in support of Sinner, he died on August 14, 2002, from cardiomyopathy. The album debuted at number 14 on the Billboard 200 chart. Drowning Pool released a reissue of the album called the "Unlucky 13th Anniversary Edition" in 2014. The album was put at no. 25 on Metal Descent's list "The 25 Best Alternative Metal Albums". Their songs "Mute", "Told You So", and "Reminded" were featured on Dragon Ball Z: Cooler's Revenge.

Writing and recording
Dave Williams explained how the album got its name in an MTV interview: 

Williams also remarked on the track order: "We wanted to start with 'Sinner' and end with 'Sermon'. We covered all the bases on religion and bad relationships."

On "Sermon", Mike Luce stated: 

The Unlucky 13th Anniversary Edition of the album contains an unreleased demo called "Heroes Sleeping". CJ Pierce explained the meaning of the song:

Track listing

Personnel
Adapted from the album's liner notes.

Drowning Pool
 Dave Williams – vocals
 C. J. Pierce – guitars
 Stevie Benton – bass
 Mike Luce – drums

Production
 Jay Baumgardner – production, mixing at NRG Studios, Hollywood, California
 James Murray – engineering
 J.D. Andrew – assistant engineering
 Tom Baker – mastering at Precision Mastering, Hollywood, California
 Stig – guitar tech
 Ross – drum tech at Drum Doctors

Artwork
 Ed Sherman – album artwork
 Glen DiCrocco – photography
 Chapman Baehler – band photo

Chart positions

Weekly charts

Year-end charts

Certifications

References

Drowning Pool albums
Wind-up Records albums
Albums produced by Jay Baumgardner
2001 debut albums